The Wallowa Lake Tramway is an aerial cable gondola lift near Joseph, Oregon, in the Wallowa-Whitman National Forest of the United States, named for Wallowa Lake. The tram runs from the floor of the Wallowa Valley to the top of Mount Howard.

History
The tramway was built in 1968, and opened for service in 1970. In June 1992, a malfunction caused the evacuation of the lift's passengers who were then flown by helicopter down the mountain, with no injuries reported. This was the first safety incident for the tram. Later that year, the tramway was used to haul fire fighters fighting a forest fire to the top of the mountain. In 1999, tram owners explored expanding the tramway to include a winter resort.

Operations
Twenty-five towers are used along the route to support the cables of tramway. The Wallowa Lake Tramway rises  vertically, starting at the  level of the lake. The Tramway runs May through October. It formerly ran on the weekends in winter for skiing and snowshoeing. The four-person gondolas take fifteen minutes to make a one-way trip.

The tram is the steepest four-person gondola in North America, ending at the  peak of Mount Howard. At the summit one can view wildlife, and wildflowers in an alpine meadow. Parts of Oregon, Washington, and Idaho are visible from the summit. Two miles (3 km) of hiking trails are available.

References

External links
Wallowa Lake Tramway (official website)

Transportation in Wallowa County, Oregon
Tourist attractions in Wallowa County, Oregon
Wallowa–Whitman National Forest
Gondola lifts in the United States
1968 establishments in Oregon
Joseph, Oregon